Nigerpeton (Niger, for the country, and herpeton (Greek), meaning crawler; ricqlesi, named for Armand de Ricqle`s) is an extinct crocodile-like genus of temnospondyl amphibian from the late Permian (Changhsingian) period. These temnospondyls lived in Niger, which was once known as central Pangaea, about 250 million years ago. Nigerpeton is part of the Cochleosauridae family, a family of edopoid temnospondyl amphibians known from the late Carboniferous (Pennsylvanian) and early Permian (Cisuralian).

History and discovery 
Joulia  was the first to publish a notice of vertebrate remains in the Permian Moradi Formation located in northern Niger. In the late 1960s French paleontologists set out on three short expeditions to this formation however only described a single taxon, the captorhinid reptile, Moradisaurus grandis. Taquet was the first to mention any temnospondyl remains in the Upper Permian rocks in northern Niger but did not describe the fossils. In the 1982 description of the Moradisaurus grandis skull, Ricqlès and Taquet reported finding numerous temnospondyl remains during the 1960s three expeditions.

Specimens of Nigerpeton were first collected during fieldwork in 2000, 2003, and 2006 where new fossils representing two new temnospondyl genera were discovered Sidor et al.The new temnospondyl genera were named by Sidor et al. as Nigerpeton ricqlesi and Saharastega moradiensis. This specimen was collected from a layer of a conglomerate in the Moradi Formation approximately 20km west of Arlit, north-central Niger.

Previously it was thought that edpoids were restricted to a narrow latitudinal band straddling the paleo equator in the late carboniferous and early Permian of Euramerica. With the discovery of these new edpoids in the Moradi formation it extended the time span of early Euramerican edpoids and the new African species.

Description

Skull 

When viewed dorsally, the Nigerpeton skull is triangular in shape a feature present in temnospondyl forms as well as an elongated shape. The full skull length ranges from 45 cm in the Musée National du Niger (MNN) MOR69 specimen to a midline length of 56 cm in MNN MOR70 specimen. Dermal bones are 2 to 6 mm in thickness. Along the lateral margins, the Nigerpeton skull is straight until it hits the external naris where lateral bulges are visible this is an autapomorphic characteristic in Chochleosaurine. The orbits on Nigerpeton are dorsally elevated with wide spacing in between orbits on the skull roof and very posteriorly located. Due to the far posteriorly positioning of the orbits the skull has a very elongated preorbital region along with a short postorbital region a disitinctive condition of cochleosaurids. Nigerpeton holds a record for the longest preorbital region corresponding to more than 80% of its skull length in edpoids. The tip of a Nigerpeton snout is rounded and pierced by two paired circular anterior vacuities for positioning of symphyseal tusks an automorphic feature in Nigerpeton. Anteriorly the skull decreases in height resulting in a flat snout with the external nostril rims elevated above the snout. Other features seen in the skulls are deep and wide longitudinal canals sprayed by pronounced longitudinal ridges.

Nigerpeton possesses a honey-comb pattern as an ornament trait on its mandible and skull roof, as well as alternating and elongated ridges and groove ornamentation at the periphery and reaching toward the bone. This ridge and groove ornamentation has been suggestive of areas that experience intensive growth, for instance, the premaxillary, maxillary, and nasal regions alike edopids experience. 

A lateral-line system is visible in Nigerpeton during the adult stage, a sensory system that  is only found in aquatic vertebrates. There are Canals 3-10mm wide and 3-6 mm deep located on the external surface of the skull aswell as preorbital canals on the anterior part of the snout. A depression located posteromedial to the anterior paired vacuities could be indication of transverse prenarial sulus.

Post-cranial skeleton 
Behind the MNN MOR69 skull, an atlas was found consisting of a 41 mm high and 47 mm wide, well-ossified, and disk-shaped intercentrum. The intecentrum has a subtriangular profile measuring 21 mm in ventral length and shows a feasible attachment surface for the pluerocentrum on its right medial side. The posterior face is straight to convex while the anterior face is concaved.

About a meter from where the MNN MOR70 skull (referred to Nigerpeton) was located, three presacral vertebrae along with their associated ribs (MNN MOR83) and an isolated femur (MNN MOR 82) were found. This vertebra consists of isolated neural arches, the usual shape of temnospondyls. The prezygapophyses are well developed with their contact face with the corresponding postzygapophyses being very elongated. Neural spines are elongated and posterodorsally oriented. Their lateral crests end in relatively smooth dorsolateral apophyses, which are a usual character in adult temnospondyls. The transverse processes is said to extend between 90 and 140 degrees from the body arch. Relative to Nigerpeton's small sized ribs and slight curvature this suggests the vertebrae be anteriorly located alongside the vertebral column.

Paleobiology

Feeding ecology 
According to Nigerpeton’s dentation, Nigerpeton's unique dentation suggests a highly carnivorous ecology. Even though complete Nigerpetons teeth are not available, the visible tooth row shows the dentation was usually rounded in cross-section like in non-stereospondyl temnospondyls. Nigerpeton’s great heterodonty such as the numerous and differently sized marginal and palatal tusks is great among temnospondyls and is likely associated with the capability to catch and sustain prey in the mouth before swallowing.

Classification 
Nigerpeton belongs to the clade Cochleosauridae, a subdivision of the greater clade Edopoidea. Edopoidea belongs to the clade Temnospondyli so there are many cranial features that unite Nigerpeton to the basal temnospondyl clade Edopoidea.

The cladogram below shows the relationships between these clades based on Sidor et al., 2005 and Steyer et al., 2006, which were based on the matrix of Sequeria 2004  who proposed a phylogeny of 17 basal temnospondyls constructed from an analysis of 61 characters.

Paleoenviroment 
All Nigerpeton specimens were retrieved from the upper one-third of the Moradi Formation located in Arlit, Niger, a late Permian formation approximately 259 to 252 Ma. During this geologic period, this region was known as Central Pangea, it was said that during the Late Permian that desert-like conditions replaced the previous moderate climate according to Geologic data and climate simulations. Recent work exhibits that arid to hyperarid conditions occurred during Moradi deposition.

References 

Permian amphibians of Africa
Fossil taxa described in 2005
Prehistoric amphibian genera
Taxa named by Christian Sidor

Cochleosauridae
Temnospondyls